Dhali is a panchayat town in Tirupur district  in the state of Tamil Nadu, India.

Geography
It has an average elevation of 367 metres (1204 feet).
Dhali is located in Tirupur District, which has been newly formed.

Demographics
 India census, Dhali had a population of 6303. Males constitute 50% of the population and females 50%. Dhali has an average literacy rate of 59%, lower than the national average of 59.5%: male literacy is 64% and, female literacy is 54%. In Dhali, 10% of the population is under 6 years of age.

References

Villages in Coimbatore district